Franchise activism refers to forms of activism carried out by autonomous individuals or groups in different localities under the same name. This name usually describes an idea put into action rather than the mandate of a single organization. Some examples of franchise activism include:
Critical Mass
Food Not Bombs
Homes Not Jails
Independent Media Center
Radical cheerleaders
Reclaim the Streets
Animal Liberation Front
Earth Liberation Front
Copwatch
Ya Basta Association

Franchise activism should not be confused with social franchising, which takes concepts of commercial franchising and applies them to non-profit or non-governmental organizations that have offices and operations in more than one place.

See also
Leaderless resistance
Mutual aid

DIY culture
Activism by type